Antonio Vidal González (born 22 April 1964) is a retired Argentine football striker.

References

1964 births
Living people
People from Posadas, Misiones
Argentine footballers
San Martín de Tucumán footballers
Guaraní Antonio Franco footballers
Estudiantes de La Plata footballers
Argentinos Juniors footballers
Club Nacional footballers
C.S. Emelec footballers
Club Atlético Colón footballers
Defensor Sporting players
Club Bolívar players
C.D. Jorge Wilstermann players
The Strongest players
Oriente Petrolero players
Unión Tarija players
Bolivian Primera División players
Association football forwards
Argentine expatriate footballers
Expatriate footballers in Uruguay
Argentine expatriate sportspeople in Uruguay
Expatriate footballers in Ecuador
Argentine expatriate sportspeople in Ecuador
Expatriate footballers in Bolivia
Argentine expatriate sportspeople in Bolivia
Sportspeople from Misiones Province